Carey Beebe (born 1960, in Melbourne) is an Australian harpsichord maker and technician.

Early training and work
After studies at the Sydney Conservatorium where his teachers included Gordon Watson and Robert Goode, Beebe graduated with a music degree as a harpsichord major and three performance diplomas including a Fellowship of Trinity College London. He then trained at the workshop of D. Jacques Way. Since 1999 Beebe has been working with the French harpsichord maker Marc Ducornet and The Paris Workshop.

Maker
Beebe has scrutinized, maintained, and prepared instruments on five different continents. He has worked closely with performers including William Christie & Les Arts Florissants, Richard Egarr, Richard Hickox, Christopher Hogwood, Igor Kipnis, Ton Koopman, Trevor Pinnock, Christophe Rousset & Les Talens Lyriques, and Colin Tilney by providing instruments and services in venues like the Sydney Opera House.

Technician
Beebe has expertise in maintaining early keyboard instruments under adverse conditions such as the tropics. One of his instruments was transported to Thursday Island in the Torres Strait to portray Summer from Vivaldi’s The Four Seasons for the Vast Productions documentary feature film 4, released in August 2007.

Beebe’s major clients include Opera Australia, the Sydney Conservatorium, the Singapore Symphony Orchestra, and the Chinese University of Hong Kong. As a guest technician, he has maintained harpsichords for Moscow’s Tchaikovsky Conservatory, Helsinki’s Sibelius Academy and the Shanghai Conservatory of Music. Since 1999, he has been the resident early keyboard technician for each year’s Carmel Bach Festival in California.

Sources

External links
Web site of Carey Beebe Harpsichords Australia
Opera Australia
Singapore Symphony Orchestra
Chinese University of Hong Kong
Carmel Bach Festival

Harpsichord makers
Australian musical instrument makers
1960 births
Living people
Sydney Conservatorium of Music alumni